La Motte is a tidal island, and listed archaeological site, also known as Green Island, located in the Vingtaine de Samarès in the parish of St Clement on the south-east coast of Jersey, Channel Islands.

There is evidence of human visits to the island since Neolithic times, having left a cairn, a number of middens and cists which were uncovered in the early 20th century. The rock is from the late Pleistocene covered with loess below a grassy surface.

Location

The island has a grassy surface and is predominantly clay surrounded by rocks. In recent times efforts have been made to reduce erosion of the island by the construction of walls and steps. It is only accessible at low tide and cut off twice a day when the sea water rises.

Archaeology

Some archaeological evidence has been found here. Remains of a cemetery on La Motte are believed to be from later settlers. There are Neolithic elements including a cairn and a number of middens, dating from 1500 BC to 300 BC, on La Motte. The 18  cists have been removed, and transferred to the La Hougue Bie museum. They were excavated between 1911 and 1914.

Geological site 
The surrounding area and beach were listed as a site of special scientific interest in 2009. The rock was laid down in the late Pleistocene and is covered with preserved loess. They provide evidence of past environmental changes in the locality.

Gallery

See also
 Archaeology of the Channel Islands
 Jersey dolmens

References

External links

Saint Clement, Jersey
Uninhabited islands of the Bailiwick of Jersey
Tidal islands
Archaeological sites in Jersey
Protected areas of Jersey